Krishnamma Kalipindi Iddarini is a 2015 Telugu romance film directed by R. Chandru produced by Sridhar Lagadapati. The film stars Sudheer Babu, and Nanditha Raj, with music by Hari. The film is the remake of the 2013 Kannada film Charminar, also directed by Chandru.

The film got selected for Jaipur International film festival for competition category, where it won Best Romantic Film.

Cast 
Sudheer Babu as Krishna
Nanditha Raj as Radha
Posani Krishna Murali as Krishna's college principal
Saptagiri as Bhaskar
Preethi Asrani as Divya
M.S. Narayana
Pragathi
Chaitanya Krishna as Krishna's college mate
 Naga Chaitanya as himself

Soundtrack
Total of 6 songs label Aditya music

01 – "Veelunte" – Nakul Abhyankar
02 – "Radhe Radhe" – Haricharan 
03 – "Ola Ola" – Hari, Hemachandra  
04 – "Madana Mohana" – Pranavi, S. P. B. Charan 
05 – "Tuhi Tuhi" – Haricharan, Sunil Kashyap, Lipsika 
06 – "Naa Raadha Tholisaari" - Kaarthik

Production
Lagadapati Sridhar decided to remake the Kannada film Charminar in Telugu after he was impressed with the film. Chandru and Hari who were part of Kannada original was chosen to direct and compose music for this version thus making their debuts in Telugu films. Sudheer Babu and Nanditha, who earlier paired in Prema Katha Chitram (2013), were chosen for the film. Makers have modified the premise of the film in the Telugu version to suit the Krishna river.

Reception 
Jeevi of Idlebrain.com wrote that "Krishnamma Kalipindi Iddarini is a well-intended film that stays away from forced commercial elements and sticks to the basic plot. Though the movie starts as a teen love story, there is nobility in the way story progresses". A critic from 12telugu opined that "On the whole Krishnamma Kalipindi Iddarini is a well made emotional love story. Sudheer Babu and Nandhita’s stunning performance are major assets".

References

External links 
 

2015 films
2010s Telugu-language films
Indian romantic action films
Films shot in Telangana
Telugu remakes of Kannada films
Films scored by Achu Rajamani
2010s romantic action films
Films directed by R. Chandru
Films shot in Andhra Pradesh
Films set in Andhra Pradesh